The London Borough of Waltham Forest is a London borough in north-east London, England. Its population is estimated to be 276,983 in 2019. It borders five other London boroughs: Enfield to the north-west, Haringey to the west, Hackney to the south-west, Newham to the south-east and Redbridge to the east, as well as the non-metropolitan county of Essex to the north.

The borough was formed in 1965 from the merger of the municipal boroughs of Leyton, Walthamstow and Chingford; it took its name from Waltham Forest – an institution which managed deer in south-west Essex.

Epping Forest is a remainder of the former Waltham Forest and forms the eastern and northern fringe of the borough. The River Lea lies to the west where its associated marshes and parkland form a green corridor which, along the reservoir-lined reaches, separates north and east London, and is the historic border between Middlesex and Essex.

Waltham Forest was one of the host boroughs of the London Olympics in 2012, with the Lee Valley Hockey and Tennis Centre and part of the Queen Elizabeth Olympic Park providing an ongoing legacy in the UK and London.

History

Early history
The area was in the territory of the Trinovantes tribe during the Iron Age and through the Roman period, when the tribal area was a unit of local government. It subsequently became part of the Kingdom of the East Saxons a unit which is likely to have its roots in the territory of the Trinovantes. After the Kingdom of Essex lost its independence, it evolved into the county of Essex.

The Domesday book of 1086 records four manors in the area, Chingford, Walthamstow, Higham and Leyton. At some point, before or after the Domesday survey these also became parishes, with Higham becoming part of the parish of Walthamstow. These parishes had largely stable borders from which those of the later Municipal Boroughs were derived, and these are the basis of our understanding of the extent of these local areas today.

Preservation of Epping Forest
The southern part of Epping Forest still extends into the north of the borough, 90% of it having been preserved by the Epping Forest Act of 1878. This not only assisted in preserving the forest, the attraction value also helped stimulate urbanisation of nearby areas.

Urbanisation
Until the late Victorian era, the area that became the modern borough was rural in nature with a small dispersed population and a primarily agricultural landscape. Leyton, in particular, grew quite rapidly between 1870 and 1910.

Industrial firsts
In 1892, a private citizen named Frederick Bremer built the first British motorcar in a workshop in his garden, at Connaught Road, Walthamstow. The vehicle is on display at the Vestry House Museum in Walthamstow.
In 1909, the aviation pioneer A V Roe successfully tested the first all-British aeroplane, the Roe I Triplane, on land at Walthamstow Marshes.

Air Raids in World War One
The area now known as Waltham Forest experienced at least two Zeppelin raids during World War I. On 17/18 August 1915, Airship L10 took a route roughly following the Gospel Oak to Barking railway line, dropping incendiary and high-explosive bombs. The first bomb, an incendiary, fell on Hoe St, Walthamstow, at the junction of Orford and Queens Road; the last was dropped in Aldersbrook area. Ten people were killed in Leyton and another 48 injured across the wider area. On 23/24 September 1916 the German Navy airship L 31 dropped around ten bombs along the line of Lea Bridge Road, Leyton, killing eight there. On both occasions the Germans believed they were bombing the City, and it is thought they mistook the Lee Valley Reservoir Chain for the Thames.

Blitz - World War Two
During the most intense period of the Blitz (October 1940 to June 1941), the area was hit by around 728 high explosive bombs, 17 parachute mines and an unknown, but much greater number of small incendiary bombs. Subsequent raids were lighter and less frequent, but 1944 saw a number of V-1 'flying bombs' and V-2 long-range ballistic missiles hit the area, including a V-1 which landed on central Walthamstow killing 22 and a V-2 which landed on Chingford Road, Walthamstow killing 8.

Creation of the modern Borough

The London Government Act 1963 established the borough in 1965 from the combined areas of the former Municipal Borough of Chingford, Municipal Borough of Leyton and Municipal Borough of Walthamstow.

A petition opposed calling the new borough "Walthamstow", so perhaps for that reason the new borough took its name from the former Waltham Forest, an institution responsible for managing deer in an area that stretched eastwards from the River Lea and included large areas of agricultural land as well as the wooded areas subsequently known as Epping Forest and Hainault Forest.

Settlement

The main centres of population in the borough are Chingford in the north, Walthamstow in the centre (the administrative hub including the council offices) and Leyton and Leytonstone to the South. Waltham Forest has the fifth largest Muslim population in England and the third largest in London (coming after its neighbouring boroughs, Newham and Tower Hamlets).

Ethnicity

Open spaces
Epping Forest and the green corridor along the River Lea provide some of the borough's many open spaces, which include:
 Epping Forest (part)
 Queen Elizabeth Olympic Park (part)
 Lee Valley Reservoir Chain (part)
 Walthamstow Marshes
 The Walthamstow Wetlands Reserve, opened in 2017, provides  of open space.
 Leyton Jubilee Park
 Lloyd Park
 Ridgeway Park
 Chingford Mount Cemetery
 Mansfield Park
 Highams Park Field

Arts, culture and leisure
Historically known as the seat of the Arts and Crafts Movement under the stewardship of William Morris, Waltham Forest has continued to succour many contemporary artists & art groups. These include the North East London Independent Artists (NELIA) group, based at the Changing Room Gallery in Lloyd Park, the 491 Gallery in Leytonstone, and a number of independent artists, also mainly in the Leytonstone area. The annual E17 Art Trail, which includes open studios, exhibitions and events, is the biggest art event in the borough, and there is now a similar event in Leytonstone. Eamon Everall, founder member of the Stuckism art movement is a long-time resident in the borough where he also maintains a studio.

Waltham Forest is home to a number of musicians that have found success in the UK, including East 17, Blazin' Squad, and Indie band Hefner, who formed in Walthamstow. The borough is also a centre of the grime musical genre; grime acts hailing from the borough include More Fire Crew, Lethal Bizzle, and Jammer amongst others.

The borough had a key role in the history of rave music culture, whether it be clubs, artists, and DJs. Widely regarded as one of the seminal tracks of jungle music, the creator of "We Are I.E." Lennie de Ice grew up and lived in Walthamstow. Walthamstow was also home to DJ Rap and MC Navigator. The venue Dungeons was located on the Lea Bridge Road in Leyton, and a number of pirate radio stations including Friends FM, Dance FM, and Eruption FM broadcast from tower blocks such as the Cathall Estate in Leytonstone.

The only theatre in the borough, The Waltham Forest Theatre, was situated in Lloyd Park. Though a local campaign was launched to save it in 2008  the theatre was demolished in 2011.

Leyton Orient F.C. is the local professional football team, based at Brisbane Road, Leyton.  In the 1962–63 season the club played in the top tier of English football, the Football League First Division, but currently are in League Two, the fourth tier of the English football league system.

Truman's Brewery is moving to Waltham Forest close to Blackhorse Road underground station in 2020, which will be a new entertainment hub in Walthamstow.

Waltham Forest is the first ever London Borough of Culture. The award from the Mayor of London ensures that arts and culture are placed at the heart of our communities. Some of the programmes are: Hennography, Polish Jazz London Series, Human Library, E17: My Home, Waltham Forest Cello Fest - "London Borough of Culture meets Classical Music", We're all bats, E17 Designers Winter Night Market, Red Light Busking, Underground Lunchtime Recitals, Forest Uprising, Welcome to the Forest  and Fighter Workshops.

Housing
Waltham Forest was one of six local authorities to set up a Housing Action Trust under the Housing Act 1988. The Waltham Forest HAT covered various estates in need of regeneration: Cathall Road in Leytonstone, Oliver Close in Leyton, Boundary Road in Walthamstow and Chingford Hall in Chingford. The HAT transferred its redeveloped estates to Community-based Housing Association and shut down in April 2002. English Partnerships then demolished four empty tower blocks.

The remaining Council housing in the borough is now managed by an arms-length management organisation, Waltham Forest Housing (formerly Ascham Homes).

Olympics
Waltham Forest was one of four host boroughs in east London for the 2012 Olympics. The northern part of the Queen Elizabeth Olympic Park is located in Eton Manor. The borough hosted events in its  three Olympic-size swimming pools, one synchronised swimming pool and one water polo pool. These pools were used for athlete training.

During the Paralympic Games, Eton Manor hosted the Wheelchair Tennis events, with temporary seating for 10,500 spectators.

In April 2012, the Ministry of Defence identified the roof of Fred Wigg Tower as a potential location for surface-to-air missile defences during the Games.

Education

Waltham Forest has a number of institutes, including 3 colleges of further education. Leyton Sixth Form College was the second sixth form college in Southern England to get a licence, and was awarded the title of best college in London for sport in 2013. Others include Waltham Forest College and Sir George Monoux College. Waltham Forest has a sixth form college reorganised system which it adopted in 1985.

Neighbouring authorities
Neighbouring authorities are Epping Forest (Essex) in the north, Redbridge in the east, with Newham and Hackney to the south. Haringey and Enfield lie to the west.

Constituent districts and wards

Districts

 Bakers Arms
 Cann Hall
 Chingford
 Chingford Hatch
 Friday Hill
 Hale End
 Highams Park
 Leyton
 Leytonstone
 Upper Walthamstow
 Walthamstow
 Whipps Cross

Wards

Cann Hall
Cathall
Chapel End
Chingford Green
Endlebury
Forest
Grove Green
Hale End and Highams Park
Hatch Lane
High Street
Higham Hill
Hoe Street
Larkswood
Lea Bridge
Leyton
Leytonstone
Markhouse
William Morris
Wood Street
Valley

Transport 
The Central line of the London Underground serves the south of the borough, running alongside the A12 road with stations at Leyton and Leytonstone. The Victoria line runs roughly through the middle of the borough with stations at Walthamstow Central and Blackhorse Road. The Gospel Oak to Barking line of London Overground has stations at Walthamstow Queen's Road, Blackhorse Road, Leyton Midland Road and Leytonstone High Road. London Overground also runs services on the Lea Valley lines from Liverpool Street station in the City of London and serves stations at  St James Street, Walthamstow Central, Wood Street, Highams Park and Chingford. Greater Anglia serves the south-west of the borough with a station at Lea Bridge. A number of London Buses routes serve the borough, as well as six night bus routes. The Central line and the Victoria line are both part of the Night Tube, which provides overnight tube services on Friday and Saturday nights. The pioneering Mini Holland program has begun to provide protected cycle lanes across the southern half of the borough, increasing the ability to use bicycles as a transport option.

In March 2011, the main forms of transport that residents used to travel to work were: underground, metro, light rail, tram, 21.0% of all residents aged 16–74; driving a car or van, 7.0%; bus, minibus or coach, 7.0%; train, 6.5%; on foot, 4.3%; work mainly at or from home, 2.1%; bicycle, 1.8%.

Law enforcement
There is one police station which is based in Chingford and a number of additional patrol centres throughout the borough. Policing is now provided by the North-East Basic Command Unit (BCU) following a merger of Waltham Forest's and Newham's policing in 2018

Notable residents

Waltham Forest is the birthplace of William Morris, best known as one of the principal founders of the British Arts and Crafts Movement. Morris was a designer of wallpaper and patterned fabrics, a writer of poetry and fiction, and a pioneer of the socialist movement in Britain.

Other notable people, such as footballer and former England Captain David Beckham, rapper, songwriter and actor Redzz, I, Claudius star Derek Jacobi, former Essex and England cricket Captain Graham Gooch, and the film director and producer Alfred Hitchcock, were also born in the borough. The heavy metal band Iron Maiden was formed in Leyton, and Eastenders actress Rita Simons was born in Leytonstone. Notable Eastenders Actor Adam Woodyatt is from Walthamstow. The poet Pascale Petit, shortlisted three times for the TS Eliot poetry prize, lives in Walthamstow. Notable rap/grime artist Lethal Bizzle is from Walthamstow, and Grayson Perry, the 2003 Turner Prize-winning artist, has his studio in Walthamstow. X Factor finalist Fleur East is also from Walthamstow as well as British Taekwondo Athlete Lutalo Muhammad.

Sports teams
 Leyton Orient Football Club
 West Essex F.C.
 Leyton Football Club
 Lee Valley Lions

Twinned cities
The London Borough of Waltham Forest is twinned with

 Saint-Mandé, France,
 Wandsbek, Germany,
 Antigua and Barbuda, and
 Dominica.

Friendship links have also been established with

 Mirpur, Pakistan.

Gallery

See also

Waltham Forest parks and open spaces
Waltham Forest Guardian
Whipps Cross Hospital

References

External links

 Waltham Forest Council
 Local newspaper
 Waltham Forest Police

 
Waltham Forest
1965 establishments in the United Kingdom
Pakistani-British culture in London